The Lioré et Olivier LeO H-22 was a French amphibious plane, primarily intended for aerial mail transport.

Design
The LeO H-22 was a flying boat with a three part cantilever high wing, primarily of both wood and metal construction. The Gnome-Rhône 5Bc 5-cylinder radial engine, driving apusherpropeller, was mounted in a streamlined nacelle, supported on struts, over the wing centre-section.

The LeO H-221 three-seat trainer flying boat, derived from the H-22, differed in cockpit arrangement and was powered by a  Salmson 9Ab 9-cylinder radial engine, also driving a pusher propeller.

Variants
H-22 Airmail transport amphibious plane, Gnome-Rhône 5Bc 5-cylinder radial .
H-221 Trainer  amphibious plane, Salmson 9Ab 9-cylinder radial.

Specifications

References

Further reading
 

Amphibious aircraft
1930s French civil aircraft
H-22
High-wing aircraft
Single-engined tractor aircraft
Aircraft first flown in 1931